"By the Way" is a song by American funk rock band Red Hot Chili Peppers. It is the title track and first single released from the band's eighth studio album of the same name (2002), on June 24, 2002. The song was the band's sixth number-one hit on the Modern Rock Tracks chart and spent seven weeks at number one on the Mainstream Rock Tracks chart. Internationally, the song reached number two in the United Kingdom, becoming the band's highest-peaking single there alongside "Dani California", and peaked atop the Italian Singles Chart.

Regarding its release, guitarist John Frusciante noted: "It wasn't really our decision to put that song out first, but our managers thought it was an exciting song and their enthusiasm convinced us. I guess they thought that it combined the wild part of our sound with the melodic part of our sound." Vocalist Anthony Kiedis elaborated: "I thought that single was an über-bombastic assault of non-commercialism. For it to be so well-received [in the United Kingdom] was shocking to me, but thrilling at the same time."

Music video
The music video was directed by Jonathan Dayton and Valerie Faris, a couple who have directed many other music videos for the band. The video was released on June 10, 2002.

The video starts off with Kiedis calling for a taxi. He gets in the taxi and the cabbie (played by Dave Sheridan) realizes he has him as his passenger. To please him, the driver puts a copy of the "By the Way" single into the taxi CD player, making Kiedis smile slightly. Suddenly, the cabbie begins driving out of control as he lip-syncs the song while driving rambunctiously throughout the streets of Los Angeles. After he locks the car door, an uncomfortable and apprehensive Kiedis attempts to make a call on his cell phone, but the cabbie brakes so hard that Kiedis loses grip of it. The cabbie snatches the phone and throws it out the window, then drives the car in a cloud of dust and backs up under a bridge.

While there, the cabbie pulls out flare sticks and begins to torture Kiedis through awkward dancing while the latter finally pages bassist Flea and Frusciante (with a message reading, "Help! Been kidnapped."), who are having lunch in a cafe. At first, they think it's a hoax, so they ignore the first message. When Kiedis pages them for the second time, they set out on Flea's Ford Bronco to find him with the crazy cabbie in the taxi. A wild chase and road rage ensues. Kiedis soon sees Flea and Frusciante, breaks out of the taxi window, and jumps in Flea's truck with a sigh of relief as the three escape the cabbie. At the end of the video, drummer Chad Smith flags down the taxi, with the cabbie realizing he is also a member of the band, so he lets him in and drives off with him. However, Chad is unaware that this is the same taxi man that kidnapped Kiedis and also ignores the broken glass.

Kiedis said of the video:

The fast and often jerky camera angles used in the high-speed chase sequences are based on the 2000 Mexican film Amores Perros in which all the characters are linked by a car crash at the beginning of the film; before the crash is an almost identical high speed car chase sequence.

Live performances
"By the Way" has been performed over 600 times since 2002, making it the band's fourth-most-performed song.

Track listing
CD single and Australia CD1
 "By the Way" – 3:35
 "Time" – 3:47
 "A Teenager in Love" – 3:01

CD version 2 and Australia CD2
 "By the Way" – 3:35
 "Search and Destroy" (Live) – 12:13
 "What Is Soul?" (Live) – 3:58

CD version 3
 "By the Way"
 "Time"
 "Search and Destroy" (Live)

CD version 4, UK and Japanese CD single
 "By the Way" – 3:35
 "Time" – 3:47
 "Teenager in Love" – 3:01
 "Search and Destroy" (Live) – 12:13

7-inch single and Canadian CD single
 "By the Way"
 "Time"

DVD single
 "By the Way" (music video) – 3:36; directed by Jonathan Dayton and Valerie Faris
 "Obsessive, Compulsive, Psychologically, Misarranged Cabdriver/Fan (aka the making of "By the Way")" – 13:45; directed by Byron Shaw and Bart Lipton for Brown & Serve
 "By the Way" (Performance Version) – 3:36

Personnel
Red Hot Chili Peppers
 Anthony Kiedis – lead vocals
 John Frusciante – guitar, backing vocals
 Flea – bass
 Chad Smith – drums, tambourine

Charts

Weekly charts

Year-end charts

Certifications

Release history

"Waiting 4" Peter Gelderblom remix

An electro house remix of "By the Way" by Peter Gelderblom with co-production by Rene Amesz, was released on July 5, 2007, and became a popular track in clubs worldwide despite being released without the band's knowledge or approval. The song is called "Waiting 4", which is a prominently featured lyric in the original song. It reached number 29 for one week in the United Kingdom in December 2007. It is included on the compilation Wild Weekends 04 (2007). It was C-listed by BBC Radio 1. A music video was made for the single. It was uploaded on Data Records' official YouTube account on November 13, 2007.

Charts

References

2002 songs
2002 singles
Data Records singles
Music videos directed by Jonathan Dayton and Valerie Faris
Number-one singles in Italy
Red Hot Chili Peppers songs
Song recordings produced by Rick Rubin
Songs written by Anthony Kiedis
Songs written by Chad Smith
Songs written by Flea (musician)
Songs written by John Frusciante
Warner Records singles